Christine McGuinness (née Martin; born 20 March 1988) is an English model, television personality and former beauty queen. She appeared on the ITVBe reality series The Real Housewives of Cheshire between 2018 and 2020 and has appeared on other television series such as The Real Full Monty and The Games. In 2021, she took part in a BBC documentary alongside her husband Paddy to raise awareness about autism.

Early life and career
McGuinness was born in Blackpool on 20 March 1988 and suffered sexual abuse at the hands of a family member, whilst her father was a heroin addict. She began her career as a “beauty queen”. She entered various pageants and was named Miss Liverpool in 2007. Alongside her husband, McGuinness appeared on Who Wants to Be a Millionaire? and All Star Mr & Mrs in 2012. From 2018 to 2020, she appeared as a cast member on The Real Housewives of Cheshire. McGuinness has since appeared on a number of television shows including Loose Women, Steph's Packed Lunch, Hey Tracey!, This Morning and Good Morning Britain. In November 2021, she released her autobiography A Beautiful Nightmare: My Story. In December 2021, she appeared on Strictly The Real Full Monty and in 2022 will be a contestant on the sports television competition The Games. In 2022, McGuinness started a podcast with her husband, 'Table Talk with Paddy and Christine McGuinness.

Personal life
McGuinness married actor, comedian and presenter Paddy McGuinness in June 2011 and they have three children. McGuinness is autistic, as are her three children. They took part in a documentary, Paddy and Christine McGuinness: Our Family and Autism. The coupled announced their separation in July 2022.

Television

Awards and nominations

References

1988 births
Living people
People on the autism spectrum
People from Blackpool
English television personalities